Zykovo is a rural locality (a village) in Nikolskoye Rural Settlement, Kaduysky District, Vologda Oblast, Russia. The population was 12 as of 2002.

Geography 
Zykovo is located 20 km northeast of Kaduy (the district's administrative centre) by road. Yaryshevo is the nearest rural locality.

References 

Rural localities in Kaduysky District